Xavier T. Brunson is a United States Army lieutenant general who serves as the commanding general of I Corps since October 6, 2021. He previously served as deputy commanding general of I Corps from May 2021 to September 2021, and commanding general of the 7th Infantry Division from August 2019 to May 2021, with assignments as chief of staff of XVIII Airborne Corps from August 2017 to June 2019 and deputy commanding general for operations of the 10th Mountain Division from November 2016 to June 2017. 

A native of Fayetteville, North Carolina, Brunson enrolled in Reid Ross High School. Brunson holds a bachelor's degree in Political Science from Hampton University (where he earned his commission in 1990), a master's degree in Human Resources from Webster University, and a master's degree in National Security and Strategic Studies from the United States Army War College.

References

External links

Living people
Date of birth missing (living people)
Year of birth missing (living people)
People from Fayetteville, North Carolina
Military personnel from North Carolina
Hampton University alumni
Webster University alumni
United States Army War College alumni
Recipients of the Defense Superior Service Medal
Recipients of the Legion of Merit
African-American United States Army personnel
United States Army generals
21st-century African-American people